The University of Dole was founded in 1423 by Philip the Good of Burgundy at Dole in the Free County of Burgundy (then a principality of the Holy Roman Empire, but now in France). It became a leading university in western Europe, historically notable for its teaching of canon and civil law.

History
From its foundation the university was student run, on the Bologna model, but in 1613 the college of professors sent a formal deputy to the archdukes in Brussels, seeking to convert the University to a Magisteruniversität such as Louvain and Douai. The archdukes issued edicts (1616-1618) with that intent, but the students would not have it, overtly repudiated the edicts, and boycotted the university. It is probable that the edicts were never enforced.

In 1691 Louis XIV, who had conquered the region in 1678, moved the university from Dole to Besançon where its successor is now known as the University of Franche-Comté.

Notable faculty
 Henry Cornelius Agrippa von Nettesheim - lectured on Johann Reuchlin's De verbo mirifico (1509)

Notable alumni
 Wigle Aytta van Zwichem (1507-1577) – Dutch statesman and jurist, received his doctorate from Dole in 1526
 Otto von Truchsess von Waldburg (1514-1573) –  Prince-Bishop of Augsburg
 Claude de La Baume (1534-1584) – cardinal and Archbishop of Besançon
 Balthazar Gerards (1557-1584) – assassin of William the Silent
 Jean-Baptiste Besard (1567-1625?) – Lawyer, Doctor of Medicine and Composer for the Lute
 Antoine Brun (1599-1654) – diplomat
 Jean-Bernard Knepper – Burgomeister of Luxemburg City 1693-1698

See also 
 List of medieval universities

Notes

References
 Beaune and D'Arbaumont, (1870) Les Universités de Franche-Comté: Gray, Dole, Besançon J. Marchand, Dijon HathiTrust
 Theurot, J. (1992) "L'Université de Dole de sa fondation à son transfer à Besançon", in M. Gresset and F. Lassus (eds) Institutions et vie universitaire dans l'Europe d'hier et d'anjour d'hui. Actes du Colloque de l'Association interuniversitaire de l'Est Paris, pp. 25-44

1420s establishments in the Holy Roman Empire
Dole
Dole
1423 establishments in Europe